"Take You Home" is a song by British-Norwegian boyband A1, released as the lead single from their fourth studio album, Waiting for Daylight. Released nearly a year prior to the album, it is the group's first single release not to feature former band member Paul Marazzi, as he left the group seven years prior. The single was released on 2 November 2009 in Norway only, after heavy promotion of the song on The X Factor in Norway. The song peaked at No. 9 on the Norwegian Singles Chart, and at No. 3 on Norwegian iTunes. The track also served as the 2009 Norwegian Comic Relief charity single.

Chart positions

Year-end charts

References

A1 (band) songs
2009 singles
Songs written by Ben Adams
Songs written by Christian Ingebrigtsen
Songs written by Mark Read (singer)
2009 songs
Sony BMG singles